Nicolle is a given name and a surname.

Given name 

 Nicolle Dickson, Australian actress
 Nicolle Flint, Australian politician
 Nicolle Galyon, American country music singer
 Nicolle Payne, American water polo player
 Nicolle Wallace, former White House Communications Director

Surname 

 Charles Nicolle, French bacteriologist who earned the 1928 Nobel Prize in Medicine
 David Nicolle, British military historian
 Ethan Nicolle, American comic book creator known for Axe Cop
 Jason Nicolle, former English professional squash player
 Jorge Carpio Nicolle, Guatemalan politician
 Louis Nicolle, French politician
 Stéphanie Nicolle, Jersey lawyer
 Victor-Jean Nicolle, artist

See also 

 Nicole